Esanthelphusa dugasti is a species of crab that belongs to the family Gecarcinucidae. Esanthelphusa dugasti lives in India, Myanmar, Cambodia, Laos, Vietnam, and Thailand. People in northern Thailand rely on Esanthelphusa dugasti as a source of protein.

References

Crustaceans described in 1902
Fauna of India
Fauna of Myanmar
Fauna of Cambodia
Fauna of Laos
Fauna of Vietnam
Fauna of Thailand
Gecarcinucidae
 Edible crustaceans